Camilo José Arcadio Cela Conde, 2nd Marquess of Iria Flavia (born 17 January 1946), is a Spanish writer. He is the son of Nobel Prize winning writer Camilo José Cela and is currently a Professor of Philosophy of law, Morality and Politics at the University of the Balearic Islands.

He published his first book El reto de los halcones in 1975, the same year he finished his degree in Philosophy.

In 1989 he published Cela, mi padre, a special dedication to his father who was awarded the Nobel Prize in Literature that same year.

In 2003 he became the Marquess of Iria Flavia.

Bibliography
 El reto de los halcones. Antología de la prensa apocalíptica española en la apertura (1975) 
 Carlos Mensa, crónica de una realidad tangente (1975) 
 Capitalismo y campesinado en la isla de Mallorca (1979) 
 De genes, dioses y tiranos. La determinación biológica de la moral (1985) 
 Cela, mi padre. La vida íntima y literaria de Camilo José Cela contada por su hijo (1989) (2002) 
 Paisajes urbanos (1994) 
 A fuego lento -with Koldo Royo & Horacio Sapere- (1999) 
 Senderos de la evolución humana -with Francisco José Ayala Pereda- (2001) 
 Como bestia que duerme (2004) 
 Telón de sombras (2005) 
 La profecía de Darwin. Del origen de la mente a la psicopatología -with Julio Sanjuan Arias- (2005)  
 La piedra que se volvió palabra. Las claves evolutivas de la humanidad -with Francisco José Ayala Pereda- (2006) 
 Hielos eternos. Un antropólogo en la Antártida (2009) 
 El origen de la idea. Galápagos tras Darwin (2011) 
 Evolución humana. El camino hacia nuestra especie -with Francisco José Ayala Pereda- (2013) 
 Cela, piel adentro (2016)

Ancestors

References

1946 births
People from Madrid
Spanish male writers
Living people
Academic staff of the University of the Balearic Islands
Human evolution theorists
Spanish philosophers
Spanish people of Basque descent
Spanish people of English descent
Spanish people of Italian descent
Margraves of Iria Flavia